The Garfield School, at 3212 1st Ave., S.S in Billings, Montana, was built in 1920.  It was listed on the National Register of Historic Places in 2012.  It has also been known as the New South School and as the Garfield Building.

It is a brick masonry building which has two stories plus a daylit basement.  It was built in stages in 1920, 1934, and 1948 as additions to an original 1901 building which was itself demolished in 1981.  The additions were all designed by Chandler C. Cohagen of McIver & Cohagen.

References

Schools in Yellowstone County, Montana
National Register of Historic Places in Yellowstone County, Montana
Neoclassical architecture in Montana
School buildings completed in 1920
1920 establishments in Montana
School buildings on the National Register of Historic Places in Montana
Buildings and structures in Billings, Montana